An axiom is a proposition in mathematics and epistemology that is taken to be self-evident or is chosen as a starting point of a theory. 

Axiom may also refer to:

Music 
 Axiom (band), a 1970s Australian rock band featuring Brian Cadd and Glenn Shorrock
 Axiom (record label), best known for Bill Laswell releases
 Axiom (Archive album), 2014
 Axioms (album), an album by Asia
 "Axiom", a song by British blackened death metal band Akercocke
 Axiom (rapper), rapper, beatmaker and record producer
  Axiom (Christian Scott album), 2020

Computers and information technology 
 Axiom (computer algebra system), a free, general-purpose computer algebra system
 Axiom Engine, 3D computer graphics engine
 AXIOM (camera), a professional grade open hardware and free software digital cinema camera
 Apache Axiom, a library providing a lightweight XML object model

Other uses 
 Axiom, the name of the luxury starship in the film WALL-E and in the home short BURN-E
 Isuzu Axiom, a sport utility vehicle produced 2001–2004
 Axiom Space, a company planning to build a private space station
 Axiom Research Labs, an aerospace company also known as TeamIndus
 Axioms (journal), an academic journal
 Axiom (wrestler), professional wrestler

See also 
 Axiomatic (disambiguation)
 Axion (disambiguation)
 Acxiom (disambiguation), a marketing technology and services company